Baret Yoshida (born April 26, 1975) is an American mixed martial artist. He competed in the bantamweight and featherweight divisions.

Biography
Yoshida was born in Hawaii. He started training Jiu Jitsu in 1994 at Relson Gracie’s academy. In 1999, Yoshida switched to the Inoue brother’s gym, led by Egan and Enson Inoue.

In 2002, Egan Inoue awarded Yoshida his black belt in Brazilian jiu-jitsu.

In 2022, Yoshida was inducted into the ADCC Hall of Fame as part of the inaugural class.

Professional grappling career
Yoshida gained recognition with his participation in the 2001 ADCC Submission Wrestling World Championship (Abu Dhabi Combat Club) where he made it to the finals, though he lost.

On August 6th, 2021, Yoshida submitted Jeff Nolasco with a crucifix choke at Fight 2 Win 180.

He returned then at Fight 2 Win 183 on September 10, 2021 to challenge for the gi featherweight title. He submitted Bernardo Pitel with an anaconda choke and won the belt.

Yoshida was then set to defend that title at Fight 2 Win's sister-promotion, Subversiv 6 on October 16, 2021. He defeated Takahito Yoshioka by decision and retained his title.

On January 7th, 2023, Yoshida submitted Garry Nakamura in the main event of Fight 2 Win 216.

Mixed martial arts record

|-
| Win
| align=center| 6-6-1
| Jamie Shaffer
| Submission (Rear-Naked Choke)
| NFC: Native Fighting Championship 5
| 
| align=center| 1
| align=center| 1:52
| Campo, California, United States
| 
|-
| Loss
| align=center| 5-6-1
| Hatsu Hioki
| TKO (Punches)
| Shooto: Back To Our Roots 8
| 
| align=center| 1
| align=center| 4:51
| Tokyo, Japan
| 
|-
| Loss
| align=center| 5-5-1
| Yoshiro Maeda
| KO (Punches)
| Pancrase: Hybrid 10
| 
| align=center| 1
| align=center| 1:29
| Tokyo, Japan
| 
|-
| Loss
| align=center| 5-4-1
| Jeff Curran
| KO (Punch)
| UCC Hawaii: Eruption in Hawaii
| 
| align=center| 2
| align=center| 2:08
| Honolulu, Hawaii, United States
| 
|-
| Win
| align=center| 5-3-1
| Jason Bress
| Submission (Rear Naked Choke)
| SB 25: SuperBrawl 25
| 
| align=center| 1
| align=center| 3:16
| Honolulu, Hawaii, United States
| 
|-
| Draw
| align=center| 4-3-1
| Hiroyuki Abe
| Draw
| Shooto: Treasure Hunt 5
| 
| align=center| 3
| align=center| 5:00
| Tokyo, Japan
| 
|-
| Win
| align=center| 4-3
| Caleb Mitchell
| Technical Submission (Guillotine Choke)
| Shogun 1: Shogun 1
| 
| align=center| 1
| align=center| 1:53
| Honolulu, Hawaii, United States
| 
|-
| Loss
| align=center| 3-3
| Katsuya Toida
| Decision (Majority)
| Shooto: To The Top 6
| 
| align=center| 3
| align=center| 5:00
| Tokyo, Japan
| 
|-
| Loss
| align=center| 3-2
| Tetsuo Katsuta
| Decision (Unanimous)
| Shooto: To The Top 1
| 
| align=center| 3
| align=center| 5:00
| Tokyo, Japan
| 
|-
| Win
| align=center| 3-1
| Mamoru Okochi
| Decision (Majority)
| Shooto: R.E.A.D. 10
| 
| align=center| 3
| align=center| 5:00
| Tokyo, Japan
| 
|-
| Win
| align=center| 2-1
| Masahiro Oishi
| Submission (Rear Naked Choke)
| Shooto: R.E.A.D. 5
| 
| align=center| 2
| align=center| 1:48
| Tokyo, Japan
| 
|-
| Loss
| align=center| 1-1
| Mamoru Yamaguchi
| TKO (Punches)
| SB 15: SuperBrawl 15
| 
| align=center| 3
| align=center| 1:18
| Honolulu, Hawaii, United States
| 
|-
| Win
| align=center| 1-0
| Ryan Cabrera
| Submission (Rear Naked Choke)
| SB 14: SuperBrawl 14
| 
| align=center| 1
| align=center| 1:50
| Guam
|

See also
List of male mixed martial artists

References

External links
The Arena - Coaches Profile
 Baret Yoshida on bjjheroes.com
 Best kept secret: The Arena lands major coup, hires Baret Yoshida on sportofboxing.com
 

1975 births
American male mixed martial artists
American practitioners of Brazilian jiu-jitsu
People awarded a black belt in Brazilian jiu-jitsu
American sportspeople of Japanese descent
Bantamweight mixed martial artists
Featherweight mixed martial artists
Mixed martial artists utilizing Brazilian jiu-jitsu
Living people
World No-Gi Brazilian Jiu-Jitsu Championship medalists
ADCC Hall of Fame inductees